Faruj Rural District is a rural district (dehestan) in the Central District of Faruj County, North Khorasan Province, Iran. At the 2006 census, its population was 7,488, in 1,947 families.  The rural district has 22 villages.

References 

Rural Districts of North Khorasan Province
Faruj County